The 2016–17 UEFA Youth League knockout phase (play-offs and round of 16 onwards) began on 7 February 2017 and concluded on 24 April 2017 with the final at Colovray Stadium in Nyon, Switzerland, to decide the champions of the 2016–17 UEFA Youth League. A total of 24 teams competed in the knockout phase.

Times up to 25 March 2017 (play-offs, round of 16 and quarter-finals) are CET (UTC+1), thereafter times (semi-finals and final) are CEST (UTC+2).

Round and draw dates
The schedule of the knockout phase is as follows (all draws are held at the UEFA headquarters in Nyon, Switzerland).

Format
The knockout phase involves 24 teams: 16 teams which qualify from the UEFA Champions League Path (eight group winners and eight group runners-up), and eight teams which qualify from the Domestic Champions Path (eight second round winners):
The eight group winners from the UEFA Champions League Path enter the round of 16.
The eight group runners-up from the UEFA Champions League Path and the eight second round winners from the Domestic Champions Path enter the play-offs. The eight play-off winners advance to the round of 16.

Each tie in the knockout phase is played over one match. If the scores are level after full-time, the match is decided by a penalty shoot-out (no extra time is played).

The mechanism of the draws for each round is as follows:
In the draw for the play-offs, the eight second round winners from the Domestic Champions Path are drawn against the eight group runners-up from the UEFA Champions League Path, with the teams from the Domestic Champions Path hosting the match. Teams from the same association cannot be drawn against each other.
In the draw for the round of 16, the eight group winners from the UEFA Champions League Path are drawn against the eight play-off winners. Teams from the same UEFA Champions League Path group cannot be drawn against each other, but teams from the same association can be drawn against each other. The draw also decides the home team for each round of 16 match.
In the draws for the quarter-finals onwards, there are no seedings, and teams from the same UEFA Champions League Path group or the same association can be drawn against each other. The draws also decide the home team for each quarter-final, and the "home" team for administrative purposes for each semi-final and final (which are played at a neutral venue).

On 17 July 2014, the UEFA emergency panel ruled that Ukrainian and Russian clubs would not be drawn against each other "until further notice" due to the political unrest between the countries. This restriction, if necessary, applies to the draws for the play-offs, round of 16 and quarter-finals (should such meeting be possible given that the identity of the quarter-finalists are not known at the time of the draw), where matches are hosted by one of the teams, but not to the semi-finals and final, which are played at a neutral venue.

Qualified teams

UEFA Champions League Path

Domestic Champions Path

Play-offs
The draw for the play-offs was held on 12 December 2016, 14:00 CET, at the UEFA headquarters in Nyon, Switzerland. The play-offs were played on 7 and 8 February 2017.

|}

Bracket (round of 16 onwards)
The draw for the round of 16 onwards was held on 10 February 2017, 13:00 CET, at the UEFA headquarters in Nyon, Switzerland.

Round of 16
The round of 16 matches were played on 21 and 22 February 2017.

|}

Quarter-finals
The quarter-finals were played on 7 and 8 March 2017.

|}

Semi-finals
The semi-finals were played on 21 April 2017 at Colovray Stadium, Nyon.

|}

Final
The final was played on 24 April 2017 at Colovray Stadium, Nyon.

References

External links
2016–17 UEFA Youth League

3